Kenneth Murray Brown (December 19, 1948 – July 22, 2022) was a Canadian professional ice hockey goaltender.  

Despite winning the Canadian Major Junior Hockey League (CMJHL) Goaltender of the Year and being on the CMJHL First All-Star Team in 1967, Brown went undrafted coming out of junior, so he signed a free agent contract with the Dallas Black Hawks of the Central Hockey League, the Chicago Black Hawks minor league affiliate.  He played one game with Chicago, where he was behind Tony Esposito and Gerry Desjardins on the depth chart, and this was his only game in the National Hockey League.

Brown moved to the new World Hockey Association (WHA) when selected by the Calgary Broncos in the 1972 WHA General Player Draft, although his rights were traded to the Alberta Oilers (renamed as Edmonton Oilers in his second season) for cash. Brown won 21 games with the Oilers over two seasons, appearing in 52 games as the backup to Jack Norris and Jacques Plante. Brown died in July 2022 at the age of 73.

Awards
CMJHL First All-Star Team – 1967
WCJHL Second All-Star Team – 1968

See also
List of players who played only one game in the NHL

References

External links

Article on WHA featuring Brown

1948 births
Living people
Canadian ice hockey goaltenders
Chicago Blackhawks players
Dallas Black Hawks players
Edmonton Oilers (WHA) players
Edmonton Oilers announcers
Ice hockey people from Ontario
Moose Jaw Canucks players
National Hockey League broadcasters
Sportspeople from Thunder Bay
Winston-Salem Polar Twins (SHL) players